This partial list of province nicknames in the Philippines compiles the aliases, sobriquets and slogans that provinces in the Philippines are known by (or have been known by historically), officially and unofficially, to municipal governments, local people, outsiders or their tourism boards or chambers of commerce.

Current official nicknames are highlighted in bold.

List

See also

List of city and municipality nicknames in the Philippines
Lists of nicknames – nickname list articles on Wikipedia

References

Philippines
Nicknames